Zang Cailing (born May 18, 1954 in Dalian) is a Chinese coach and former international football player who represented Dalian Mining Plant, Air Force Football Team, Bayi Football Team and Dalian FC while internationally he played for China in the 1980 Asian Cup.

Playing career 
Zang Cailing initially followed in his fathers footsteps and trained to be a carpenter before he joined the Dalian Sports School. After he graduated he joined amateur football club Dalian Mining Plant before impressing the Air Force Football Team to sign him. With the club under the sport branch of the People's Liberation Army Air Force, Zang would be conscripted, however he found military life hard to adjust to. Despite this Air Force Football Team were allowed to take part in the top tier of Chinese football, which got Zang noticed for the Chinese national team. Within the national team Zang would be converted from a striker to a defender under Su Yongshun who included him in the 1980 Asian Cup, 1982 World Cup Qualifiers and 1982 Asian Games. Zang would return to club football and joined Bayi Football Team before joining Dalian FC where he retired.

Career statistics

International statistics

References

External links
Team China Stats
Player profile at Sodasoccer

1954 births
Living people
Chinese footballers
Footballers from Dalian
China international footballers
1980 AFC Asian Cup players
Bayi Football Team players
Dalian Shide F.C. players
Association football defenders